At the Back of the North Wind is a children's book written by Scottish author George MacDonald. It was serialized in the children's magazine Good Words for the Young beginning in 1868 and was published in book form in 1871.  It is a fantasy centered on a boy named Diamond and his adventures with the North Wind. Diamond travels together with the mysterious Lady North Wind through the nights.  The book includes the fairy tale Little Daylight, which has been pulled out as an independent work, or separately, added to other collections of his fairy tales.

Plot introduction
The book tells the story of a young boy named Diamond. He is a very sweet little boy who makes joy everywhere he goes. He fights despair and gloom and brings peace to his family. One night, as he is trying to sleep, Diamond repeatedly plugs up a hole in the loft (also his bedroom) wall to stop the wind from blowing in. However, he soon finds out that this is stopping the North Wind from seeing through her window. Diamond befriends her, and North Wind lets him fly with her, taking him on several adventures. Though the North Wind does good deeds and helps people, she also does seemingly terrible things. On one of her assignments, she must sink a ship. Yet everything she does that seems bad leads to something good. The North Wind seems to be a representation of Pain and Death working according to God's will for something good.

Themes
In this book, MacDonald touches on many theological and philosophical questions, especially concerning theodicy. Today, it is considered one of his masterpieces. According to MacDonald's son and biographer Greville MacDonald, there are many similarities between Diamond and MacDonald's own son Maurice, who died young. Diamond seems to represent Christ, always trying to help others while not completely belonging to this world.

Abridged editions
In 1914, a version "Simplified for Children" by Elizabeth Lewis was published by Lippincott.  This newer version shortened the original length of approx. 89,339 words to 27,605 words.  It was illustrated by Maria L. Kirk.

External links 

 
 complete text, from Project Gutenberg
 At the Back of the North Wind Ebook (PDF format)
 At the Back of the North Wind, a stage musical
 At the Back of the North Wind Blackie and Sons 1911 edition with color illustrations
 A German article on "At the back of the North Wind"
 
 Radio Theatre adaptation/dramatization by Focus on the Family
At The Back of the North Wind Unabridged Audiobook (2020) by Goblin Market Theatre Company Ltd.

Children's fantasy novels
Scottish children's literature
1871 British novels
Novels by George MacDonald
Novels first published in serial form
Works originally published in British magazines
Works originally published in children's magazines
1871 fantasy novels
1870s children's books
British children's novels
British children's books
British fantasy novels
19th-century British children's literature